Nano Cabrera is a singer, guitarist, and composer born in Condado, Puerto Rico, who was a member of Haciendo Punto en Otro Son, the musical group that brought popularity to typical Puerto Rican music during the last quarter century.  He was a close friend of Tony Croatto, and is a cousin of golfer Ángel Cabrera.

Cabrera was featured on a very popular, Old Colony soda commercial in Puerto Rico during the early 1980s.

His popular song "Isla Para Dos" was covered by Thalía on 2008's Lunada.

References

Year of birth missing (living people)
Living people
People from Santurce, Puerto Rico
Musicians from San Juan, Puerto Rico
Singers from San Juan, Puerto Rico
Puerto Rican male composers
Puerto Rican guitarists
20th-century Puerto Rican male singers
Puerto Rican singer-songwriters
American male singer-songwriters